Agbogho Mmuo, or Maiden Spirits are annual performances held during the dry season in the Nri-Awka area in the northern part of the Igbos' traditional territory in Nigeria. Performed only by men wearing masks, the masquerades imitate the character of adolescent girls, exaggerating the girls' beauty and movements. The performance is always accompanied by musicians who sing and play tributes to both real and spirit maidens.

The performances showcase an ideal image of an Igbo maiden. This ideal is made up by the smallness of a young girl's features and the whiteness of her complexion, which is an indication that the mask is a spirit. This whiteness is created using a chalk substance used for ritually marking the body in both West Africa and the African Diaspora. The chalky substance is also used in uli design, created and exhibited on the skin of Igbo women. Most maiden spirit mask are decorated with representations of hair combs, and other objects, modeled after late 19th-century ceremonial hairstyles. These hairstyles include elaborate coiffures and crests which intend to add beauty to the mask.

This art style is featured in the book Purple Hibiscus written by Chimamanda Ngozi Adichie. The book also describes a Masquerade performance.

Igbo art
Igbo society
Masquerade ceremonies in Africa